Hikmet Farhad oglu Hajiyev is an Azerbaijani public figure who serves as the Foreign Policy Advisor to the President of Azerbaijan. He also serves as the Head of Foreign Policy Affairs Department of the Presidential Administration.

Early life and diplomatic career 
Hajiyev was born in 1979 in Ganja (then known as Kirovabad) and graduated from Secondary School No. 24. He graduated from the Faculty of International Relations and International Law in Baku State University. He also holds a master's degree from NATO's Defense College, the George C. Marshall European Center for Security Studies, and Université libre de Bruxelles. Hajiyev has worked in the system of the Ministry of Foreign Affairs since 2000. In different years, he worked at Azerbaijani representative offices in NATO, Kuwait, and Egypt. From 2014 to 2018, Hajiyev served as the head of the Press Service of the Ministry of Foreign Affairs. On 9 July 2018, he was awarded the Medal for Distinguished Service in Diplomatic Service, and a year later, he was awarded the Order of Merit for Service to the Fatherland of the 2nd degree.

Foreign policy advisor 
On 18 September 2018, he was appointed Deputy Head of the Foreign Policy Department of the Presidential Administration. Later that November, he became the head of this department and on 29 November 2019, he became an official assistant to the President. When describing his role in the administration during the July 2020 Armenian–Azerbaijani clashes, President Aliyev said that he is "speaking with my assistant Hikmet Hajiyev probably 10 times a day".

Statements 
Hajiyev praised the effectiveness of the IAI Harop during the 2020 Nagorno-Karabakh war.

References 

Living people
Government ministers of Azerbaijan
1979 births
People from Ganja, Azerbaijan
Baku State University alumni